Count of Baños is an hereditary title in the Peerage of Spain accompanied by the dignity of Grandee, granted in 1621 by Philip IV to Sancho Martínez de Leyva, iure uxoris Marquess of Leyva and knight of the Order of Santiago.

Counts of Baños (1621)

Sancho Martínez de Leyva y Suárez de Mendoza, 1st Count of Baños
Mariana Isabel de Leyva y Mendoza, 2nd Countess of Baños
Pedro de la Cerda y Leyva, 3rd Count of Baños
Teresa María de la Cerda y Lancastre, 4th Countess of Baños
María Ana Josefa de la Cerda y Rocaberti, 5th Countess of Baños
Francisco Coloma y de la Cerda, 6th Count of Baños
Domingo Fernández de Córdoba y Portocarrero, 7th Count of Baños
María Francisca de Sales Portocarrero y Zúñiga, 8th Countess of Baños
Eugenio Palafox y Portocarrero, 9th Count of Baños
Cipriano de Palafox y Portocarrero, 10th Count of Baños
María Francisca de Sales Portocarrero y Kirkpatrick, 11th Countess of Baños
Carlos María Fitz-James Stuart Portocarrero, 12th Count of Baños
Jacobo Fitz-James Stuart y Falcó, 13th Count of Baños
Eugenia Sol María del Pilar Fitz-James Stuart y Falcó, 14th Countess of Baños
Carlos Alfonso de Mitjans y Fitz-James Stuart, 15th Count of Baños
Macarena de Mitjans y Verea, 16th Countess of Baños
Jaime Patiño y Mitjans, 17th Count of Baños

See also
List of current Grandees of Spain

References

Grandees of Spain
Counts of Spain
Lists of Spanish nobility
Noble titles created in 1621